Raissa Ruus (18 September 1942 – 14 January 1986) was an Estonian middle-distance runner. She competed in the women's 800 metres at the 1972 Summer Olympics.

References

1942 births
1986 deaths
Athletes (track and field) at the 1972 Summer Olympics
Estonian female middle-distance runners
Soviet female middle-distance runners
Olympic athletes of the Soviet Union
Place of birth missing